Lepik or Leppik is a common Estonian surname (meaning "alder forest"), with notable bearers including:

Andres Lepik (born 1957), actor
August Lepik (1881–1955), politician
Kalju Lepik (1920–1999), poet
Krista Lepik (born 1964), biathlete
Liina Kersna (née Lepik; born 1980), journalist and politician
Liis Lepik (botn 1994), footballer
Mait Lepik (born 1968), actor
Margus Lepik (born 1969), politician
Mark Anders Lepik (born 2000), footballer
Marko Lepik (born 1977), footballer
Mihkel Leppik (1932–2021), rowing coach
Elmar Leppik (1878–1978), mycologist
Silver Leppik (born 1983), basketball player
Sakarias Jaan Leppik (born 1969), priest, musician and journalist
Elisabet Lepik-Talvik (Betti Alver) (1906–1989), poet

Estonian-language surnames